The following are the football (soccer) events of the year 1930 throughout the world.

Events

Winners club national championship 

 Denmark: B93
 Greece: Panathinaikos
 Italy: Internazionale Milano F.C.
 Hungary: Újpest FC
 Poland: Cracovia
 Spain: Athletic Bilbao
 Argentina: Boca Juniors
 England: The Wednesday
 Scotland:
Scottish Cup: Rangers

International tournaments
 1930 British Home Championship (October 19, 1929 – April 5, 1930)

 I. Dr. Gerö Cup (September 18, 1927 – May 11, 1930)

 FIFA World Cup in Uruguay (July 13 – 30 1930)
 
 
 Baltic Cup 1930 in Lithuania (August 15–17, 1930)

 1929-32 Nordic Football Championship (June 14, 1929 – September 25, 1932)1930: (June 1 - September 28, 1930)
 (1930)
 (1929-1932)

 Coupe des Nations in Geneva, Switzerland (June 28 – July 6, 1930)
 Újpest FC (Hungary)
 SK Slavia Praha (Czechoslovakia)
 First Vienna FC (Austria)

Births
 January 9 – Igor Netto, Soviet international footballer (died 1999)
 January 27 – Carlos Cecconato, Argentinian footballer (died 2018)
 March 14 – Hugh Baird, Scottish international footballer (died 2006)
 March 14 – Bora Kostić, Yugoslavian international footballer (died 2011)
 March 26 – Sigge Parling, Swedish international footballer (died 2016)
 April 29 – Henri Coppens, Belgian international footballer and coach (died 2015)
 May 18 – Shyqyri Rreli, Albanian international footballer and manager (died 2019)
 June 7 – Hilderaldo Bellini, Brazilian international footballer (died 2014)
 June 25
 Vic Keeble, English footballer (died 2018)
 George Thomas, Welsh footballer (died 2014)
 June 26 – Tan Ling Houw, Indonesian Olympicfootballer
 June 28 – José Artetxe, Spanish international footballer (died 2016)
 July 3 
 José Luis Lamadrid, Mexican forward (died 2021)
 Ferdinando Riva, Swiss forward (died 2014)
 July 7 – Tadao Kobayashi, Japanese football player and manager
 July 9 – Stuart Williams Welsh international footballer (died 2013)
 July 15 – Alberto Michelotti, Italian football player and referee (died 2022)
 August 22 – Gylmar dos Santos Neves, Brazilian international footballer (died 2013)
 August 23 – Luís Morais, Brazilian football international footballer (died 2020)
 September 7 – Julio Abbadie, Uruguayan international footballer (died 2014)
 October 28 – Svatopluk Pluskal, Czech international footballer (died 2005)
 November 5 – Wim Bleijenberg, Dutch international footballer (died 2016)
 November 8 – Suat Mamat, Turkish international footballer (died 2016)
 November 26 – Jacques Foix, French international footballer (died 2017)
 December 17 – Gerard Kerkum, Dutch footballer and club chairman (died 2018) 
 December 19 – Georg Stollenwerk, German international footballer and trainer (died 2014)

Deaths
30 July: Joan Gamper (Hans Max Gamper-Haessig), Swiss athlete and founder of FC Barcelona, 52 (suicide)

References

 
Association football by year